Habenaria thomana is a species of plant in the family Orchidaceae. It is found in Cameroon, Equatorial Guinea (on the island of Bioko), and São Tomé Island. Its natural habitat is subtropical or tropical moist lowland forests. It is threatened by habitat loss.

Description
The orchid grows on the ground and has short stems, up to 4 cm long. It has 4-10 leaves, 11–19 cm long and 4–4.5 cm wide. Its 14-30 whitish to greenish flowers stand in terminal racemes.

References

thomana
Vulnerable plants
Flora of São Tomé Island
Orchids of Cameroon
Orchids of Equatorial Guinea
Endemic flora of Cameroon
Endemic flora of Equatorial Guinea
Endemic flora of São Tomé and Príncipe
Taxonomy articles created by Polbot